Indian nation may refer to:

 Indigenous peoples of the Americas, most of which were historically known as Indians
 American Indian tribe, indigenous peoples of the contiguous United States
 India, a country in South Asia
 The Indian Nation (film), an alternate title for the 1940 American film Cherokee Strip
 The Indian Nation, a newspaper in the Republic of India
 Indian Nation Turnpike, a toll road in Oklahoma, United States

See also